Bergheim is a commune in the Haut-Rhin department in Grand Est in north-eastern France.

It is a completely fortified town and has a late-medieval church, as well as surviving towers and walls. The entire population was wiped out by two wars and the plague in the 17th-18th centuries. To replace the population, thousands of people from other countries were invited to immigrate to Bergheim. The majority of people who immigrated at that times were Swiss, German, Hungarian, Austrian, or Romanian.

The city economy is based on tourism and the viticulture that surrounds the town.

Geography

Climate
Bergheim has a oceanic climate (Köppen climate classification Cfb).

Gallery

See also
 Communes of the Haut-Rhin department

References

Communes of Haut-Rhin
Haut-Rhin communes articles needing translation from French Wikipedia